Pogonogenys is a genus of moths of the family Crambidae.

Species
Pogonogenys frechini Munroe, 1961
Pogonogenys masoni Munroe, 1961
Pogonogenys proximalis (Fernald, 1894)

References

Natural History Museum Lepidoptera genus database

Odontiini
Crambidae genera
Taxa named by Eugene G. Munroe